is the seventh single by Japanese entertainer Miho Nakayama. Written by Takashi Matsumoto and Kyōhei Tsutsumi, the single was released on August 21, 1986, by King Records.

Background and release
"Tsuiteru ne Notteru ne" was used by Shiseido for their autumn 1986 commercials featuring Nakayama

"Tsuiteru ne Notteru ne" peaked at No. 3 on Oricon's weekly singles chart and sold over 192,000 copies.

Track listing

Charts
Weekly charts

Year-end charts

References

External links
 
 
 

1986 singles
1986 songs
Japanese-language songs
Miho Nakayama songs
Songs with lyrics by Takashi Matsumoto (lyricist)
Songs with music by Kyōhei Tsutsumi
King Records (Japan) singles